Naineris is a genus of annelids belonging to the family Orbiniidae.

The genus has cosmopolitan distribution.

Species according to GBIF:
 Naineris antarctica Blake, 2017 
  Naineris argentiniensis Blake, 2017 
Species found in Australia according to the Australian Faunal directory are:

 Naineris australis Hartman, 1957
 Naineris grubei (Gravier, 1908)
 Naineris laevigata (Grube, 1855)
 Naineris victoriae Day, 1977
IRMNG lists 23 species including that shown in the image and those above (wth the exception of N. argentiniensis).

References

Annelids